The Huashan North railway station is a railway station located in Huayin, Weinan, Shaanxi, China. There is 5 km from Mount Hua spots, travel bus from there can take you to Huashan visitor center. It was opened on 6 February 2010, along with the Zhengzhou–Xi'an high-speed railway.

References

Railway stations in Weinan
Stations on the Xuzhou–Lanzhou High-Speed Railway
Railway stations in China opened in 2010